Roger Birrer (born 17 September 1963) is a Swiss swimmer. He competed in the men's 4 × 100 metre freestyle relay at the 1984 Summer Olympics.

References

External links
 

1963 births
Living people
Olympic swimmers of Switzerland
Swimmers at the 1984 Summer Olympics
Place of birth missing (living people)
Swiss male freestyle swimmers